Andratx is a municipality on Mallorca, one of the Balearic Islands, along the Mediterranean east coast of Spain. It is located on the southwest tip of the island. 

Port d'Andratx, located a few miles south of Andratx, is an exclusive resort.

History

The town of Andratx is ancient and until recently was mainly inhabited by local Majorcan people. The area was occupied by the Romans, who called the town Andrachium, in the 2nd century BC and pottery and coins found there give evidence of this. The town was built inland from the coast as a precaution against the constant threat of raids from Barbary pirates. In the 16th century a system of observation towers was erected on the island as a means of protection against pirates. From 14 towers in the municipalities of Andratx and Calvià, 12 still exist. The municipality also includes the towns of Port d'Andratx, Sa Coma, S'Arracó, Sant Elm and Camp de Mar. It also includes the uninhabited islet Sa Dragonera. 

The municipality has undergone a transformation since 2004, following the input of EU finance which has resulted in a facelift for the town and also brought in foreign investment.

Geography
Andratx municipality is located in the southwestern corner of the Sierra de Tramontana, the most significant mountains of the island of Majorca.

In the southern part  are a number of valleys, which are the most densely populated areas. The northern part of the municipality is mountainous and rugged, and is virtually uninhabited. The highest point is at 927 metres.

Off the coast of the municipality is the islet of Sa Dragonera, declared a Natural Park in 1995. It can be accessed by sea from Puerto de Andratx or Sant Elm

Economy

The main activity in Andratx today is tourism. Agriculture and fishing as a means of livelihood have declined considerably, and is mostly practiced now for private consumption and recreation purposes. The main crops are almonds, carob, figs and citrus fruit and grapes producing "Santa Catarina" wine.

Demographics

Throughout the twentieth century the population gradually declined to a low in the 1950s. Since then the population has been recovering steadily except in 1960 when the population increased by 2,000 people. In the early twenty-first century the pace of growth has accelerated again. with 2,200 new inhabitants between 2001 and 2005 and increasing urban pressure on the environment, especially in the capital-population centers Andratx and Puerto de Andratx. 

Andratx is one of the municipalities of Mallorca with the highest percentage of foreign residents. According to the 2001 census about 15% of the population was foreign and among them 43% were EU nationals, including roughly 15% German, 15% British and 10% French.

Art
The main monuments in the municipality are Church of Santa Maria de Andrach, Iglesia de la Virgen del Carmen del Puerto de Andratx, Church of s'Arracó, the Castell de Son Mas (Now City Hall), the Andratx Castle, and the former Trappist monastery, now in ruins. The legendary Teatro Argentino, dating back to 1912, belongs to former symbols of the municipality that have disappeared. 

Contemporary art is shown in the CCA Andrax Cultural Center (Centro Cultural Andratx), in Sa Coma, north of Andratx; in the Sa Taronja Cultural Association, west of Andratx; in the Liedtke Museum in the Port; and in the architecturally remarkable Studio Weil.

Notable people
Stephen Gately (1976–2009), singer
Guy Hamilton (1922–2016), film director; married to the below Kerima
Kerima (born 1925), actress; married to the above Guy Hamilton
John Noakes (1934–2017), television presenter
Baltasar Porcel (1937–2009), novelist 
José Luis de Vilallonga (1920–2007), actor
Peter Hook (born 1956), musician (Joy Division, New Order)
Mark Lawrenson (born 1957), footballer and broadcaster

Gallery

References

External links
Ajuntament d'Andratx
Andratx tourist information

Municipalities in Mallorca
Populated places in Mallorca